The Sisters of the Holy Family is the name for several different religious institutes of women in the Catholic Church:

The Sisters of the Holy Family (France), founded in Paris in 1806 by Jeanne-Claude Jacoulet in a revival of the Canonesses of St. Genevieve
The Sisters of the Holy Family of Villefranche, founded by Émilie de Rodat in 1816 in Villefranche-de-Rouergue, France
The Sisters of the Holy Family (Louisiana), founded in 1837 by Henriette DeLille for African-American women
The Sisters of the Holy Family of Helmet, founded in 1856 by three sisters, Rosalie, Henriette and Mélanie Van Biervliet, in Tielt, Belgium
The Sisters of the Holy Family (California), founded in 1872 by Father John J. Prendergast and Lizzie Armer in San Francisco, California, United States
The Sisters of the Holy Family of Nazareth, founded in 1875 in Rome, Italy, by Mother Mary of Jesus the Good Shepherd, a Polish noblewoman born Frances Siedliska